Diploschizia tetratoma is a species of sedge moth in the genus Diploschizia. It was described by Edward Meyrick in 1913. It is found in Guyana.

References

External links
 Diploschizia tetratoma at ZipcodeZoo.com

Moths described in 1913
Glyphipterigidae